The Eye of Spring Trade Center, also known as Dongfeng Plaza, is a complex of two skyscrapers Under construction in Kunming, China. Once completed, they will be the tallest in Kunming and Yunnan province.

The Eye of Spring complex is a part of the re-development of Dongfeng Square. Prior to the start of construction the historic Workers' Cultural Hall was demolished, the Dongfeng Square dug up, and work began on two underground metro stations on opposite sides of the square. Construction started in 2017 but was put on hold in Mid-2020 and Construction resume in 2021.

See also
List of tallest buildings in Kunming
List of tallest buildings in China

References

Buildings and structures under construction in China
Skyscrapers in Kunming
Skyscraper office buildings in China